Mallow was a constituency represented in the Irish House of Commons until 1800 and was incorporated by Charter of 1613, with a further charter of 1689. It was a manor borough, the franchise being vested in the freeholders of the manor and the returning officer its Seneschal. It was controlled by the Jephson family until the 1780s.

Members of Parliament

1613–1801

Elections
 1692
 1695
 1699 (by-election)
 1703
 1713
 1715
 1716
 1727
 1756
 1761
 1768
 1776
 1781
 1783
 1790
 1797

References
Johnston-Liik, E. M. (2002). History of the Irish Parliament, 1692–1800, Publisher: Ulster Historical Foundation (28 Feb 2002),
T. W. Moody, F. X. Martin, F. J. Byrne, A New History of Ireland 1534-1691, Oxford University Press, 1978
Tim Cadogan and Jeremiah Falvey, A Biographical Dictionary of Cork, 2006, Four Courts Press

See also
Mallow (UK Parliament constituency), 1801–1885 
Irish House of Commons 
List of Irish constituencies

Constituencies of the Parliament of Ireland (pre-1801)
Historic constituencies in County Cork
Mallow, County Cork
1613 establishments in Ireland
1800 disestablishments in Ireland
Constituencies established in 1613
Constituencies disestablished in 1800